Arthur Gómez (born 12 February 1984) is a Gambian former professional footballer who played as a striker.

Club career 
Born in Banjul, Gómez began his playing career at a non league team called London United F.C which is based in Serekunda London Corner, then was signed by  Hawks Football Club. Gómez joined Manchester United in July 2001. Having played internationally at a young age, the English club had spotted him and he was soon a part of the youth ranks. Gómez was recommended to United by Swedish club Göteborg.

Gómez was quickly sent on loan to Royal Antwerp FC in the Jupiler League from the 2002–03 season to the 2004–05 season before joining Dessel Sport for the 2005–06 season. After taking no part in the team he soon left and moved to the Chinese giants Henan Construction for the 2006 season. He left Henan after two seasons. He was signed on a trial contract by Newport County in August 2011, but they chose not to sign him on a permanent basis.

International career 
Gómez scored twice for the Gambia national team against South Africa in a friendly tournament in 2001. His last appearance for Gambia was in 2003, when they visited Senegal in Dakar for an African Cup qualifying match.

Honours
Henan Construction
 China League One: 2006

References

External links

1984 births
Living people
Sportspeople from Banjul
Gambian footballers
Association football forwards
Manchester United F.C. players
Royal Antwerp F.C. players
K.F.C. Dessel Sport players
Henan Songshan Longmen F.C. players
UE Engordany players
Chinese Super League players
China League One players
The Gambia youth international footballers
The Gambia international footballers
Gambian expatriates in China
Expatriate footballers in China